Thomas Fazio, ASGCA  (born February 10, 1945) is a golf course architect.

Fazio graduated in 1962 from Lansdale Catholic High School and was inducted into its "Hall of Fame" in 2007. He began his career in golf course design with his family's firm in suburban Philadelphia, which he left in the 1960s; he established his own firm in Jupiter, Florida in 1972. He is the nephew of George Fazio, who often credited Tom with jump-starting his own career in golf course architecture.

Fazio has designed more than 200 courses of which 46 have been ranked by Golf Digest in their greatest 200 courses in the United States. His individual honors include Best Modern Day Golf Course Architect, which he received from Golf Digest Magazine three times. In 1995, Fazio became only the second course architect to receive the highest recognition awarded by the Golf Course Superintendents Association of America - The Old Tom Morris Award.

Notable golf courses designed by Tom Fazio 

Adare Manor, County Limerick, Ireland (redesign)

Caves Valley Golf Club, Owings Mills, Maryland
Congaree Golf Club, Ridgeland, South Carolina
Conway Farms Golf Club, Lake Forest, Illinois
The Estancia Club, Scottsdale, Arizona
Firestone Country Club West Course, Akron, Ohio
Karsten Creek, Stillwater, Oklahoma
Lake Nona Golf & Country Club, Orlando, Florida
The National Golf Club of Canada, Woodbridge, Ontario, Canada
Old Overton Club, Vestavia Hills, Alabama
PGA National Resort and Spa, Palm Beach Gardens, Florida
Pinehurst Resort No. 6 and No. 8, Pinehurst, North Carolina
The Preserve Golf Club, Carmel, California
Primm Valley Golf Club, Nipton, California
Quail Hollow Club, Charlotte, North Carolina (redesign)
Sand Ridge Golf Club, Munson Township, Geauga County, Ohio
Shadow Creek Golf Course, Las Vegas, Nevada
Squire Creek Country Club, Choudrant, Louisiana
TPC Myrtle Beach, Burgess, South Carolina
Victoria National Golf Club, Newburgh, Indiana

References

External links
ASGCA Architect's Gallery - Tom Fazio entry
Tom Fazio Interview with Brett Cohen on World Talk LIVE!
Jonathan's Landing - Jupiter, Florida Community With Course Designed By Tom Fazio
American Society of Golf Course Architects profile

Golf course architects
1945 births
Living people
People from Lansdale, Pennsylvania